The following are populated places in the Cocos (Keeling) Islands; there are no cities in the islands.

 Bantam  (largest settlement, on Home Island)
 West Island
 

 
Cocos
Populated places